Amaiur was a left-wing Basque nationalist and separatist political coalition from the Basque Country and Navarre. The name of the coalition comes from the fortress of Amaiur in Navarre, which was one of the last Basque strongholds during the Spanish conquest of Iberian Navarre.

Amaiur was launched on 27 September 2011 by Eusko Alkartasuna, Alternatiba (which had both been part of Bildu), Aralar (previously in alliance with the Basque Nationalist Party, PNV in Nafarroa Bai), independent individuals of the abertzale left (including many former members of Batasuna), and other smaller groups, while the PNV refused to join. The new coalition fielded candidates for the 2011 general election in all three Basque provinces and Navarre. Amaiur won seven seats in the Congress of Deputies and three in the Senate.

At the 2015 Spanish general election, Amaiur was replaced as the representative of the left-wing Basque nationalist camp by EH Bildu that had already run in earlier local, Basque Country and European elections. It came off much weaker than Amaiur in 2011, winning only two seats in the Congress of Deputies and one Senator, although it would later see growth.

Composition

Electoral performance

Cortes Generales

Nationwide

Regional breakdown

References

 
2011 establishments in the Basque Country (autonomous community)
2016 disestablishments in the Basque Country (autonomous community)
Defunct political party alliances in Spain
Nationalist parties in Spain
Political parties established in 2011
Political parties disestablished in 2016
Political parties in Navarre
Political parties in Northern Basque Country
Political parties in the Basque Country (autonomous community)
Regionalist parties in Spain